Kargah Jehad (also Romanized as Kārgāh Jehād) is a village in Gavkan Rural District, in the Central District of Rigan County, Kerman Province, Iran. At the 2006 census, its population was 320, in 68 families.

References 

Populated places in Rigan County